Constance "Connie" Annie Poyser Wood (1897–1985) was a pioneer of radiotherapy, leading research units in London when the speciality was being established.

Early life and education
She was born in Wolverhampton in 1897. She went to Wolverhampton Girls' High School where she was captain of the hockey team and head girl. She gave up an interest in languages after nursing her brother who was wounded in the Great War. She then studied medicine at Newnham College, Cambridge from 1917 to 1920 and was then one of the first three female medical students to be trained at King's College Hospital, despite resistance to the admission of women at that time.

Radiology
From 1927, she worked as a clinical assistant at the Royal Cancer Hospital in Fulham Road, specialising in the use of radium to treat cancer. She had to resign from her position there after a favourable report on her work by Sir William Bragg was broadcast by BBC News on 6 December 1938, which was thought to breach a requirement for prior approval by the hospital. She continued as head of research at the Radium Institute in London. In 1942, she became director of the Radiotherapeutic Research Unit at Hammersmith Hospital where, in 1952, she introduced an 8 MeV linear accelerator – the first to be used for medical treatment. With her deputy, Louis Harold Gray, she then organised the construction of the first cyclotron to be installed in a hospital and this was inaugurated by the Queen in 1955.

One of her patients was the brother of Máire Mhac an tSaoi, Séamus MacEntee. While she was lecturing students about his case, he put his pet white rat down her neck and the "reaction was gratifyingly feminine".

References

1897 births
1985 deaths
Alumni of King's College London
Alumni of Newnham College, Cambridge
British radiologists
20th-century women scientists
Women radiologists